John Pelham may refer to:

John Pelham (English parliamentarian), MP for Sussex
John Pelham (bishop) (1811–1894), British Bishop of Norfolk
John Pelham (officer) (1838–1863), Confederate artillery officer
Sir John Pelham, 3rd Baronet (1623–1703), MP for Sussex
John Pelham, 8th Earl of Chichester (1912–1944), Earl of Chichester
John Pelham, 9th Earl of Chichester (born 1944), Earl of Chichester